Hoosier Pass may refer to:

 Hoosier Pass (Continental Divide), a mountain pass on the Continental Divide of the Americas between Park and Summit counties, Colorado
 Hoosier Pass (Teller County, Colorado), a mountain pass in Teller County, Colorado

See also